Marines is a 2003 American direct-to-video action film directed by Mark Roper.

Plot 
Vladimir Antonov (Hristo Shopov), a ruthless Russian warlord. is one of the most feared criminal masterminds on the planet, and when the smoke cleared on the last attempt by U.S. Marines to take Antonov down, 11 marines were killed and two were captured.  Colonel Anslow (George Roberson) has sworn that he will never let a situation like that happen to his men ever again, and over the course of the next 36 hours, he will finally have a chance to show his resolve and capture Antonov once and for all. A group of Marines led by Lieutenant Everett (Brant Cotton) is sent to Russia to capture Antonov, In this case, help comes from an unexpected source, an elite team of Russian troops commanded by Major Dmitri Kirilenko (Mark Ivanir), in whose honesty they are not quite sure.

Cast 

 Brant Cotton - Lt. Everett
 Frank Sallo - Cpl. Hamburger
 Lawrence Monoson - Sgt. Larby
 Andrew Bowen - Pvt. Carlos Guillen
 Thomas R. Martin - Pvt. Westlund 
 George Roberson - Col. Anslow
 Hristo Shopov - Vladimir Antonov
 Mark Ivanir - Maj. Dmitri Kirilenko
 Lou Hirsch - Mr. Flanders
 Atanas Srebrev - Cpl. Andersen
 George Stanchev - Staff 1
 Yavor Kalinov - Staff 2
 Nikolai Iliev - Staff 3
 Valentin Ganev - Sasha
 Kalin Yavorov - Pvt. Essex
 Yavor Raichev - Pvt. Chase
 Martin Geraskov - Pvt. Cortesi
 Borislav Chuchkov - Pvt. Deck
 Nikolai Ilchev - Pvt. Ossorio
 Dimiter Spasov - Pvt. Funador
 Yoanna Boukovska - Young Woman
 Vladimir Kolev - Russian Soldier
 Georgi Kermenski - Russian Soldier
 Zlatko Zlatkov - Russian Soldier
 Stoio Mirkov - Russian Soldier
 Anton Ugrinov - Russian Soldier
 Valeri Yordanov - Russian Soldier
 Orlin Pavlov - Injured Marine
 Svetoslav Raichev - Injured Marine
 Deylan Dubov - Criminal
 Zachary Baharov - Criminal
 Marii Rosenov - Criminal
 Andrej Slabakov - Tank Driver
 Peter Antonov - Pilot
 P.K. - Marine
 Ivanka Petrova - Mother

References

External links 

2003 direct-to-video films
2003 action films
Films shot in Bulgaria
Films set in Russia
American action films
Films directed by Mark Roper
Films produced by Boaz Davidson
Films about the United States Marine Corps